Minuscule 762 (in the Gregory-Aland numbering), ε477 (von Soden), is a Greek minuscule manuscript of the New Testament written on parchment. Palaeographically it has been assigned to the 14th century. Scrivener labelled it as 852e.

Description 
The codex contains the text of the four Gospels, on 332 parchment leaves (size ). The text is written in one column per page, 21 lines per page.

It contains Epistula ad Carpianum, Eusebian tables, Prolegomena, lectionary markings at the margin, subscription to the Gospel of Mark, and Synaxarion.

Text 
The Greek text of the codex is a representative of the Byzantine text-type. Hermann von Soden classified it to the textual family Kx. Aland placed it in Category V.

According to the Claremont Profile Method it represents textual family Kx in Luke 10. In Luke 1 and Luke 20 it has mixed Byzantine text.

History 
Scrivener dated the manuscript to the 14th century; Gregory dated the manuscript to the 14th century. The manuscript is currently dated by the INTF to the 14th century.

It was written by Markos, a monk.

In 1843 the manuscript was brought from the monastery of St. George in Locris to Athens, along with 763.

It was added to the list of New Testament manuscripts by Scrivener (852) and Gregory (762). Gregory saw the manuscript in 1886.

The manuscript is now housed at the National Library of Greece (155) in Athens.

See also 

 List of New Testament minuscules
 Biblical manuscript
 Textual criticism
 Minuscule 761

References

Further reading

External links 
 Minuscule 762 images online at the CSNTM.

Greek New Testament minuscules
14th-century biblical manuscripts
Manuscripts of the National Library of Greece